Case Closed: The Fist of Blue Sapphire, known as  in Japan, is a 2019 Japanese animated mystery film. It is the twenty-third installment of the Case Closed film series based on the manga series of the same name by Gosho Aoyama, following the 2018 film Case Closed: Zero the Enforcer. The film was released on 12 April 2019.

This was the last Heisei-era Case Closed film, released weeks before the 2019 Japanese imperial transition. The setting of the film takes place in Singapore, most notably surrounding the Marina Bay Sands.

Synopsis
The world's largest blue sapphire, the 'Blue Sapphire Fist', is said to have sunk when a pirate ship sank in the late 19th century off the coast of Singapore. A local millionaire plots to recover it, and when it reappears at a Singaporean hotel exhibit, a murder takes place and a calling card of Kaitō Kid is found at the scene.

Still in Singapore, Makoto was in the midst of participating in a martial arts tournament where he is joined by Ran and Sonoko to encourage him. Conan is stuck in Japan as he does not possess a passport. However, Kaitō Kid wants to use him to get the sapphire and kidnaps him to take him to the city-state. There, Conan must obey him if he wants to return to Japan; he has his glasses, wristwatch and clothes confiscated, among other things, and must conceal his real identity.

Ran, who does not recognize him, asks him his name and Conan improvises the name of "Arthur Hirai". Disguised as Shinichi Kudo, Kaitō Kid finally manages to get information about the sapphire that is kept in the underground vault of a mansion. During his intrusion into the premises, he is trapped and comes face to face with Makoto.

Leon Lowe, a detective and behavioural psychologist from Singapore, is also searching for the legendary secret treasure buried in the seabed and is in rivalry with Conan and Kid.

Cast

Box office 
In Japan, the film sold 313,724 tickets and earned  on its opening day. The film topped the Japanese box office and grossed  in its opening weekend, setting a new franchise record. It dropped to number two in its third week, dethroned by new release Avengers: Endgame, before Detective Conan regained the top spot in its fourth week, beating Avengers: Endgame and new release Detective Pikachu.

In its fifth week, Detective Conan was dethroned by Detective Pikachu at the Japanese box office. In five weeks, The Fist of Blue Sapphire grossed  in Japan. By its seventh weekend, the film had sold 6.71million tickets and grossed  in Japan. , it had sold 7.4million tickets and exceeded  at the Japanese box office. , the film has grossed  domestically, making it one of the top 50 highest-grossing films ever in Japan. The Fist of Blue Sapphire became the highest-grossing Detective Conan film, surpassing Zero the Enforcer.

Overseas, the film debuted at number two in China, behind only domestic Chinese film Jade Dynasty. The Fist of Blue Sapphire has since grossed  in China, . In other territories, the film has grossed $1,728,708 in South Korea and Vietnam, and $65,812 in the United Arab Emirates.

Release 
An English dub, produced by Bang Zoom! Entertainment, was released digitally by TMS Entertainment. Discotek Media has licensed the film for home video.

Reception
Ni Nyoman Wira, in The Jakarta Post, wrote "Though it sometimes feels there is too little screen-time for Conan, the movie balances it out, especially toward the end."

Film setting 
The film is set mostly in Singapore, with some scenes at the beginning taking place in Tokyo. The film centerpiece setting is a well-known Singaporean landmark — the Marina Bay Sands.

The film also showcases other aspects of Singapore, including Singapore Airlines, Maxwell Food Centre and Suntec City's "Fountain Of Wealth".

Notes and references
Plot retrieved from here

External links
Conan Movie Website

2019 films
2019 anime films
Fist of Blue Sapphire
Films set in Singapore
TMS Entertainment
Toho animated films